The Dooly County Courthouse in Vienna, Georgia is a building from 1890. It was listed on the National Register of Historic Places in 1980.

This courthouse is the fourth courthouse to serve Dooly County.

References

External links
 

Courthouses on the National Register of Historic Places in Georgia (U.S. state)
Romanesque Revival architecture in Georgia (U.S. state)
Government buildings completed in 1890
Buildings and structures in Dooly County, Georgia
County courthouses in Georgia (U.S. state)
National Register of Historic Places in Dooly County, Georgia
William H. Parkins buildings